is a Japanese actress and tarento. In 2009 at the age of 12, she won the 12th National Beauty Pageant (Japan Bishojo Contest). She played the lead role in the movie version of Thriller Restaurant (Gekijo-ban: Kaidan Resutoran) (2010) as Haru Amano.

Appearances

TV dramas
Suzuki Sensei (TV Tokyo, 2011), Mari Kanda (Suzuki Sensei has also been made into a movie released in 2013)
Hunter: Women After Reward Money (HUNTER ~ Sono Onnatachi, Shōkin Kasegi) (Fuji TV, 2011), Rei Isaka (teen)
 13-sai no Hellowork (TV Asahi, 2012), Aoi Wakatsuki
 Blackboard: Jidai to Tatakatta Kyōshitachi (TBS, 2012), Sanae Kawakami
 Kuro no Onna Kyōshi Episode 3 (TV Tokyo, 2012)
 Limit (TV Tokyo, 2013), Haru Ichinose
 Henshin Interviewer no Yūutsu (TBS, 2013), Suzuko Ebisu
 Cinderella Date (Tōkai Television Broadcasting, 2014), Aya Kijima
 Tatakau! Shoten Girl (Fuji TV, 2015), Aiko Takada

Films
 Gekijōban Kaidan Restaurant (2010), Haru Amano
 Suzuki Sensei (2013), Mari Kanda
 Kū no Kyōkai (2013), Miku Kosakai
 Katsu Fūtarō!! (2019)

Commercials
 Gust -  Cheese in Hamburg (2010)

Discography

DVD
 La Beaute (20 November 2009)

Bibliography

Photobooks
 ayano (Wani Books, 28 May 2012)

Awards
  The 12th National Beauty Pageant (Japan Bishojo Contest) (2009): Grand Prix and won the model category

References

External links
  
 

Japanese television actresses
People from Miyazaki Prefecture
1996 births
Living people